Dhadkan Zindaggi Kii is an Indian medical drama television series that stars Additi Gupta, Rohit Purohit, Vidyut Xavier as the main protagonists with Alma Hussein, Nishant Singh, Raghav Dhirr, Kaushik Chakravorty and Ashwin Mushran as the supporting cast. The show aired from 6 December 2021 to 4 March 2022 on Sony Entertainment Television and was produced by Nilanjana Purkayasstha under Invictus T Mediaworks.

Plot 
Dr. Deepika Sinha has joined F.M.S Hospital as the Chief resident and has left behind her family and love, because of her passion of medicine. She is assigned a team of junior residents: Abhay, Sia, Piroz and Wasim. While Abhay has hated his father for leaving his mother because of another woman and wants to be a Cardiothoracic surgeon, Sia is a rich girl who is full of life and wants to be a plastic surgeon. Piroz is a medical topper, desperate to have a girlfriend and has yet not decided his specialization and Wasim is a poor slum boy, who judges people too quickly and wants to open a clinic in his slum.

While working together, Deepika form a friendship with all the juniors especially Abhay, who starts to fall for her. She is successful in making the hospital set up an Emergency department, but is shocked when her ex-fiancé Dr. Vikrant Saxena is declared as the ER head. Deepika continue to work under him, and they later start an affair, much to the dismay of Aditi, Vikrant's wife. Abhay expresses his love for Deepika, who rejects it and later help him get over it, they again become friends.

Deepika eventually breaks up with Vikrant and moves on in her life. Due to an accident, Aditi dies, Vikrant blames Deepika for this and suffers from PTSD. Deepika meets a new patient Nikhil Sardesai and they became friends, he helps her gain her confidence back. Later, Deepika is declared the new ER head and eventually she and Nikhil feel comfortable with each other. Deepika decides to give the relationship a chance and balance her work and personal life. Vikrant finally leaves his medicine career, after a patient is declared dead due to his negligence.

Abhay decides to leave F.M.S. in order to learn from his father in his clinic, Wasim decides to devote time fully to his slum clinic and leaves the hospital. While Piroz finally finds his love in Isha, a junior resident and PC's niece, Sia moves on in her life with Dr. Sameer Roy, after her failed relationships with Abhay and Wasim. New resident Veer joins in place of Abhay and Wasim. Vikrant is recovering and has started ambulance service in small town.

After struggle, Deepika starts to handle ER efficiently. Deepika finally let go of her past and has a fresh start to her life. After a year long relationship, she finally marries Nikhil and they take vows to be the same and be with each other forever. Everyone congratulate them and tell Deepika that she is an inspiration on how to achieve dreams and never give up on them. The show ends with everyone dancing.

Cast

Main
 Additi Gupta as Dr. Deepika Sinha (senior surgeon, former chief resident and new ER head): Vikrant's ex-fiancé & love interest, Abhay's close friend and Nikhil's wife.
 Rohit Purohit as Dr. Vikrant Saxena (senior surgeon and former ER head): Deepika's ex fiancé & love interest; Aditi's husband; Suman's brother
Vidyut Xavier as Dr. Abhay Sathe (surgeon and junior resident): Sia's ex-boyfriend; Deepika's unrequited lover.

Recurring
 Alma Hussein as Dr. Sia Advani (surgeon and junior resident): Abhay's and Wasim's ex-girlfriend; Sameer's girlfriend
 Raghav Dhirr as Dr. Piroz Murgiwala (surgeon and junior resident): Isha's boyfriend; Meera's ex-boyfriend 
 Nishant Singh as Dr. Wasim Ansari (surgeon and junior resident): Sia's ex-boyfriend
 Sid Makkar as Nikhil Sardesai, owner of NSM (Nikhil Sardesai Meditech) and Deepika's husband.
 Meghna Kukreja as Dr. Isha Chakravorty (surgeon and junior resident): PC's niece; Piroz's girlfriend
 Niranjan Namjoshi as Dr. Amin Ali (senior surgeon)
 Benaf Dadachandji as Dr. Aditi Saxena (senior pathologist): Vikrant's wife (Dead)
 Kaushik Chakravorty as Dr. Pranav Chakravorty aka PC (senior surgeon and Director of Medicine at FMS): Deepika's mentor; Isha's uncle.
 Ashwin Mushran as Jamshed Sheriar (owner of FMS Hospital)
 Krishna Shetty as Dr. Sameer Roy (senior plastic surgeon and head of Plastic Surgery): Sia's boyfriend; Tania's uncle
 Mansi Patel as Nurse Madhavi (head nurse)
 Sanyogita Bhave as Girija Sathe: Abhay's mother; Vinayak's ex-wife
 Raja Sevak as Dr. Vinayak Paranspare (senior cardio surgeon): Abhay's father; Girija's ex-husband
 Tanu Vidyarthi as Suman Saxena: Vikrant's sister
 Urmila Tiwari as Dr. Gayatri Singh (senior gynaecologist)
 Rajesh Kamboj as Dr. Khanna (senior surgeon and head of General Surgery)
 Smita Dongre as Dr. Namrata Sharma (senior psychologist and head of Psychology Department)
 Ssivanyi Thakor as Nurse Meena
 Devanggana Chauhan as Dr. Devangana Mishra (senior surgeon and new chief resident): Deepika's college friend; Namit's ex-wife
 Vishesh Sharma as Dr. Veer Mehra (surgeon and junior resident)
 Kaajal Pattil as Dr. Divya Deshmukh (ex-junior resident)
 Unknown as Meera: Piroz's ex-girlfriend; Isha's friend
 Unknown as Namit, Devangana's ex-husband

Episodes

Production

Development
Dhadkan is a spin-off of the 2002 series of the same name. The series was initially planned with 65 episodes, but later was extended by ten more episodes, for a total of 75 episodes till 4 March.

Casting 
Additi Gupta, Rohit Purohit and Vidyut Xavier were cast as the leads. In May 2021, Ashwin Mushran and Kaushik Chakravorty were confirmed to be cast in main roles. Later that month, Alma Hussein, Raghav Dhirr and Nishant Singh joined the cast.

During the latter part of the show, Meghna Kukreja, Sid Makkar and Krishna Shetty joined the show in pivotal roles.

Training

Filming 
Principal photography commenced in June 2021 with the lead actors in Mumbai.

Lead actors Additi Gupta and Rohit Purohit announced the wrap up of "Dhadkan Zindaggi Kii" in Mumbai through an Instagram post on 1 February 2022.

Release
Dhadkan Zindaggi Kii was a long-awaited project on Sony Entertainment Television. The first promo of the show was unveiled on 11 November 2021, featuring the protagonists and revealing its release date. It started telecasting from 6 December 2021 at the 10:00 PM time-slot by replacing Kaun Banega Crorepati Season 13.

Soundtrack 

Track list

Reception
Dhadkan Zindaggi Kii received generally positive reviews from critics. Srividya Rajesh of IWM Buzz gave the show 4 out of 5 stars, praising the characters' backstories and the depiction of female doctors in a medical setting, though she questioned the hour-long duration of each episode. In a review of the first episode for Pinkvilla, Rasika Deshpande similarly felt that the show's strength was its focus on women's empowerment and applauded the performances of Gupta and Xavier. Telly Express described the show as a "natural and smooth drama" and gave it 4.3 out of 5 stars.

Awards and nominations

See also
List of programs broadcast by Sony Entertainment Television

References

External links
 
 Dhadkan Zindaggi Kii on MX Player
 Dhadkan Zindaggi Kii on SonyLIV
 Dhadkan Zindaggi Kii on Sony Entertainment Television

2021 Indian television series debuts
Hindi-language television shows
Indian television soap operas
Indian medical television series
Sony Entertainment Television original programming
2022 Indian television series endings